Adrián Rodrígues Gonçalves (born 14 August 1988) is an Andorran international footballer who plays for Atlètic Club d'Escaldes as a right back.

Club career

Rodrígues started his career playing for FC Andorra in the season 2007–08. In 2010, he signed a contract with Mensajero from the Spanish third division (fourth level). During season 2011–12 he played in different teams, playing for Huracán Z. In 2012, he played for Racing Lermeño. and the historical Spanish club Burgos.

After playing for Collado Villalba and Salmantino, He signed for Marino de Luanco in January 2015 to play in the Spanish Segunda División B (third level).

International career
Rodrígues represented the under 21-team Andorran team before his senior team debut for Andorra in 2012.

References

External links
Adri Rodrígues at La Preferente

1988 births
Living people
Andorran footballers
Andorra international footballers
FC Andorra players
CD Mensajero players
CD Huracán Z players
Racing Lermeño players
Burgos CF footballers
CU Collado Villalba players
Marino de Luanco footballers
FC Lusitanos players
Segunda División B players
Association football fullbacks
Andorran expatriate footballers
Andorran expatriate sportspeople in Spain
Expatriate footballers in Spain
Atlètic Club d'Escaldes players